Paul Junger Witt (March 20, 1941 – April 27, 2018) was an American film and television producer.  He, with his partners Tony Thomas and Susan Harris (also his wife), produced such television shows as Here Come the Brides, The Partridge Family, The Golden Girls, Soap, Benson, It's a Living, Empty Nest, and Blossom.  The majority of their shows have been produced by their company, Witt/Thomas Productions (alternately Witt/Thomas/Harris Productions), founded in 1975. Witt also produced the films Dead Poets Society, Three Kings, Insomnia, and the made-for-TV movie Brian's Song.  He was a graduate of the University of Virginia.

Personal life
Witt married Ann McLaughlin with whom he had 3 children, Christopher, Anthony, and Genevieve. After their divorce, he married Susan Harris on September 18, 1983. They have one son together, Oliver Witt.

Death
Witt died of cancer in Los Angeles on April 27, 2018, at age 77.

Filmography
He was a producer in all films unless otherwise noted.

Film

Television

As director

Miscellaneous crew

As writer

References

External links
 

1941 births
2018 deaths
Film producers from New York (state)
American television directors
Television producers from New York City
Deaths from cancer in California
Filmmakers who won the Best Film BAFTA Award
University of Virginia alumni